Żydowskie  Ukrainian Жидівське Zhydivske is a village in the administrative district of Gmina Krempna, within Jasło County, Subcarpathian Voivodeship, in south-eastern Poland, close to the border with Slovakia.

References

Villages in Jasło County